Events in the year 1956 in China. The country had an estimated population of 620 million people.

Incumbents
 Chairman of the Chinese Communist Party: Mao Zedong
 President of the People's Republic of China: Mao Zedong
 Premier of the People's Republic of China: Zhou Enlai
 Chairman of the National People's Congress: Liu Shaoqi
 Vice President of the People's Republic of China: Zhu De
 Vice Premier of the People's Republic of China: Chen Yun

Governors  
 Governor of Anhui Province: Huang Yan
 Governor of Fujian Province: Ye Fei  
 Governor of Gansu Province: Deng Baoshan
 Governor of Guangdong Province: Tao Zhu
 Governor of Guizhou Province: Zhou Lin
 Governor of Hebei Province: Lin Tie 
 Governor of Heilongjiang Province: Han Guang then Ouyang Qin 
 Governor of Henan Province: Wu Zhipu 
 Governor of Hubei Province: Liu Zihou then Zhang Tixue 
 Governor of Hunan Province: Cheng Qian 
 Governor of Jiangsu Province: Hui Yuyu 
 Governor of Jiangxi Province: Shao Shiping 
 Governor of Jilin Province: Li Youwen 
 Governor of Liaoning Province: Du Zheheng
 Governor of Qinghai Province: Sun Zuobin
 Governor of Shaanxi Province: Zhao Shoushan
 Governor of Shandong Province: Zhao Jianmin
 Governor of Shanxi Province: Pei Lisheng then Wang Shiying 
 Governor of Sichuan Province: Li Dazhang
 Governor of Yunnan Province: Guo Yingqiu 
 Governor of Zhejiang Province: Sha Wenhan

Events
 September 28 - First Plenary Session of the 8th Central Committee of the Chinese Communist Party
 September 28 - Election of the 8th Politburo of the Chinese Communist Party
 Hundred Flowers Campaign
 Continuing Kuomintang Islamic insurgency in China

Other events
 Establishment of the Chinese Skating Association
 Establishment of the Shanghai Natural History Museum
 Hnhhot Huimin Cattle and Breeding Association, as predecessor of Yili Diary Group was founded in Inner Mongolia.
 Shaoxinggaoji High School is founded.

Education
 Establishments:
 Beijing University of Chinese Medicine
 Capital University of Economics and Business
 Central Institute for Correctional Police
 Chongqing Medical University
 Chongqing Three Gorges University
 First Affiliated Hospital of Xinjiang Medical University
 Hangzhou Xuejun High School
 High School Affiliated to Beijing International Studies University

Sports
 Establishment of Jilin Northeast Tigers
Chinese Sports Committee oversees creation of new, simplified (and shorter) 24 Form Tai Chi. Due to this official promotion, the 24-form is most likely the Taiji form with the most practitioners in China and the world over.

See also
 1956 in Chinese film

References

 
1950s in China
Years of the 20th century in China